The Alfa Romeo Protèo concept car was released at the Geneva Motor Show in 1991. It is a 2-door coupé cabriolet with folding roof, 
The engine used in Protèo produces . The Protèo uses shortened floorpan used in Alfa Romeo 164 and features four wheel drive and steering.
Many of the Protèo's design cues were influenced by the Alfa Romeo 916 series GTV/Spider, which was designed in July 1988. First design sketches by Alberto Bertelli are dated for December 1989. The name Protèo is derived from a Greek deity Proteus. Concept was presented in a dark metallescent red paintwork, that was later included in the Alfa Romeo range as Rosso Proteo.

The prototype is on display at the Alfa Romeo History Museum in Arese, Italy.

References 

Proteo
All-wheel-drive vehicles
Cars introduced in 1991